Ecyroschema zanzibaricum is a species of beetle in the family Cerambycidae. It was described by Adlbauer, Sudre and Téocchi in 2007. It is known from Tanzania.

References

Endemic fauna of Tanzania
Crossotini
Beetles described in 2007